Deportivo Santa Cruz is a Curaçao football club. The team was relegated from the top division of the Curaçao League in the 2004–05 season.

References

Football clubs in Curaçao
Football clubs in the Netherlands Antilles
Association football clubs established in 1975
1975 establishments in Curaçao